List of our books and autobiographies written by Indians

References

 List
Indian autobiographies